30 Days (meaning 30 Giorni in Italian) was an Italian monthly magazine of ecclesiastical geopolitics that is widely read in the Roman Curia. It existed between 1988 and 2012.

History and profile
30 Days was first published on 2 March 1988. Father Joseph Fessio was the founder. The magazine was directed by the most "curial" of Italy's veteran Catholic politicians, senator for life Giulio Andreotti from 1993 to 2012. Published monthly in six languages, it reached all the dioceses of the world, and fully reflected the politics of Vatican diplomacy. The last issue of 30 Days appeared in Summer 2012.

See also
 List of magazines published in Italy

References

External links
  Official website

1988 establishments in Italy
2012 disestablishments in Italy
Catholic magazines published in Italy
Defunct magazines published in Italy
Italian-language magazines
Magazines established in 1988
Magazines disestablished in 2012
Magazines published in Rome
Monthly magazines published in Italy